United States v. Arvizu, 534 U.S. 266 (2002), is a case in which the Supreme Court of the United States unanimously reaffirmed the proposition that the Fourth Amendment required courts to analyze the reasonableness of a traffic stop based on the totality of the circumstances instead of examining the plausibility of each reason an officer gives for stopping a motorist individually.

Facts of the Case

U.S. Border Patrol agent Clinton Stoddard was working a checkpoint on U.S. Highway 191 north of Douglas, Arizona on an afternoon in January 1998.  In this area, the roads are equipped with sensors to alert agents to the presence of traffic on infrequently traveled roads, a sign that smugglers of drugs or aliens might be in the area.  At 2:15 p.m., a car passing on a nearby road tripped a sensor, and Stoddard went to investigate.  Agents typically changed shifts around this time.

Stoddard found the vehicle that tripped the sensor.  It was a minivan, the sort of car that smugglers use to transport their cargo.  As it approached Stoddard, it slowed dramatically, from about 55 miles per hour to about 30.  An adult man was driving.  His posture was rigid, and he conspicuously ignored Stoddard as Stoddard passed by.  Stoddard found this behavior suspicious because most drivers in the area wave at passing motorists.  Stoddard also noticed children sitting in the back seat of the minivan.  Their knees were propped up high, as if their feet were resting on something on the floor.  At this point, Stoddard pulled alongside the car.  The children in the back seat started to wave at Stoddard in a peculiar manner.  As Stoddard was driving alongside the car, the driver abruptly signaled a turn onto the last available road that would avoid the checkpoint.  Stoddard radioed for a registration check on the minivan, and found out that it was registered to an address in Douglas known for heavy narcotics trafficking.  At this point Stoddard stopped the minivan.  Stoddard learned that the driver's name was Ralph Arvizu.  Stoddard asked Arvizu for permission to search the van, and found almost 129 pounds of marijuana.

Arvizu was charged in district court with possession of marijuana with intent to distribute.  In federal court, he asked to suppress the marijuana, arguing that Stoddard did not have reasonable suspicion to stop him.  Citing these facts and the circuitous nature of the route Arvizu was taking from Douglas to nearby Tucson, the district court denied Arvizu's suppression motion.  

Arvizu appealed to the Ninth Circuit.  After analyzing each of the 10 factors relied on by the district court in isolation, the Ninth Circuit concluded that seven of the 10 factors were susceptible of an innocent explanation and thus carried little or no weight in the reasonable-suspicion analysis.  The remaining factors—the fact that the route was frequently traveled by smugglers, the timing of the alert relative to the agents' shift change, and the fact that Arvizu was driving a minivan—did not render the stop permissible.  Consequently, the court reversed Arvizu's conviction.  The government appealed to the Supreme Court.

The Court's Ruling

The Court reiterated that when reviewing courts make reasonable suspicion determinations, they must look at the totality of the circumstances to see if the officer had a particularized and objective basis for suspecting a person of committing a crime.  According to the Court, the approach taken by the Ninth Circuit, in which it found that seven of Stoddard's ten reasons were susceptible of an innocent explanation, did not examine the totality of the circumstances and thus ran counter to the de novo review that the Court had previously ruled should apply to appellate review of reasonable suspicion determinations.  For Arvizu to slow down, stiffen his posture, and avoid making eye contact was suspicious in an area like southeastern Arizona where most drivers are courteous and polite to other drivers.  Furthermore, the children had obviously been coached to wave at Stoddard as he was driving by.  Taken together, these factors suggest that Stoddard reasonably suspected Arvizu was engaged in criminal activity.

Scalia's Concurring Remarks

Scalia agreed that the Court was correct to reemphasize that the de novo standard of review applies to appellate review of rulings regarding reasonable suspicion.  Even so, he criticized the Court's deference to a district judge's "factual inferences," finding it to be incompatible with de novo review.

See also
 List of United States Supreme Court cases, volume 534
List of United States Supreme Court cases

External links
 

United States Supreme Court cases
United States Fourth Amendment case law
2002 in United States case law
United States Supreme Court cases of the Rehnquist Court